is a passenger railway station in located in the town of Hirogawa, Arida District, Wakayama Prefecture, Japan, operated by West Japan Railway Company (JR West).

Lines

Station layout
The station consists of two opposed side platforms connected to the station building by a footbridge. The station is unattended.

Platforms

Adjacent stations

|-
!colspan=5|West Japan Railway Company (JR West)

History
Hirokawa Beach Station opened on 14 March 1993.

Passenger statistics
In fiscal 2019, the station was used by an average of 197 passengers daily (boarding passengers only).

Surrounding Area
 Hirogawa Municipal Minamihiro Elementary School
 Nishihiro Beach
 Kashinaga Beach
 Kumano Kodo

See also
List of railway stations in Japan

References

External links

 Hirokawa Beach Official Site

Railway stations in Wakayama Prefecture
Railway stations in Japan opened in 1993
Hirogawa, Wakayama